Dynamical mean-field theory (DMFT) is a method to determine the electronic structure of strongly correlated materials. In such materials, the approximation of independent electrons, which is used in density functional theory and usual band structure calculations, breaks down. Dynamical mean-field theory, a non-perturbative treatment of local interactions between electrons, bridges the gap between the nearly free electron gas limit and the atomic limit of condensed-matter physics.

DMFT consists in mapping a many-body lattice problem to a many-body local problem, called an impurity model. While the lattice problem is in general intractable, the impurity model is usually solvable through various schemes. The mapping in itself does not constitute an approximation. The only approximation made in ordinary DMFT schemes is to assume the lattice self-energy to be a momentum-independent (local) quantity. This approximation becomes exact in the limit of lattices with an infinite coordination.

One of DMFT's main successes is to describe the phase transition between a metal and a Mott insulator when the strength of electronic correlations is increased. It has been successfully applied to real materials, in combination with the local density approximation of density functional theory.

Relation to mean-field theory
The DMFT treatment of lattice quantum models is similar to the mean-field theory (MFT) treatment of classical models such as the Ising model. In the Ising model, the lattice problem is mapped onto an effective single site problem, whose magnetization is to reproduce the lattice magnetization through an effective "mean-field". This condition is called the self-consistency condition. It stipulates that the single-site observables should reproduce the lattice "local" observables by means of an effective field. While the N-site Ising Hamiltonian is hard to solve analytically (to date, analytical solutions exist only for the 1D and 2D case), the single-site problem is easily solved.

Likewise, DMFT maps a lattice problem (e.g. the Hubbard model) onto a single-site problem. In DMFT, the local observable is the local Green's function. Thus, the self-consistency condition for DMFT is for the impurity Green's function to reproduce the lattice local Green's function through an effective mean-field which, in DMFT, is the hybridization function  of the impurity model. DMFT owes its name to the fact that the mean-field  is time-dependent, or dynamical. This also points to the major difference between the Ising MFT and DMFT: Ising MFT maps the N-spin problem into a single-site, single-spin problem. DMFT maps the lattice problem onto a single-site problem, but the latter fundamentally remains a N-body problem which captures the temporal fluctuations due to electron-electron correlations.

Description of DMFT for the Hubbard model

The DMFT mapping

Single-orbital Hubbard model
The Hubbard model  describes the onsite interaction between electrons of opposite spin by a single parameter, . The Hubbard Hamiltonian may take the following form:

The following assumptions have been made:
 only one orbital contributes to the electronic properties (as might be the case of copper atoms in superconducting cuprates, whose -bands are non-degenerate),
 the orbitals are so localized that only nearest-neighbor hopping  is taken into account

The auxiliary problem: the Anderson impurity model
The Hubbard model is in general intractable under usual perturbation expansion techniques. DMFT maps this lattice model onto the so-called Anderson impurity model (AIM). This model describes the interaction of one site (the impurity) with a "bath" of electronic levels (described by the annihilation and creation operators  and ) through a hybridization function. The Anderson model corresponding to our single-site model is a single-orbital Anderson impurity model, whose hamiltonian formulation, on suppressing some spin 1/2 indices , is:

where
  describes the non-correlated electronic levels  of the bath
  describes the impurity, where two electrons interact with the energetical cost 
 describes the hybridization (or coupling) between the impurity and the bath through hybridization terms 

This hybridization function describes the dynamics of electrons hopping in and out of the bath. It should reproduce the lattice dynamics such that the impurity Green's function is the same as the local lattice Green's function. It is related to the non-interacting Green's function by the relation:
 (1)

It is a difficult but not intractable problem. There exists a number of ways to solve the AIM, such as
 Numerical renormalization group
 Exact diagonalization
 Iterative perturbation theory
 Non-crossing approximation
 Continuous-time quantum Monte Carlo algorithms

Self-consistency equations
The self-consistency condition requires the impurity Green's function  to coincide with the local lattice Green's function :

where  denotes the lattice self-energy.

DMFT approximation: locality of the lattice self-energy
The only DMFT approximations (apart from the approximation that can be made in order to solve the Anderson model) consists in neglecting the spatial fluctuations of the lattice self-energy, by equating it to the impurity self-energy:

This approximation becomes exact in the limit of lattices with infinite coordination, that is when the number of neighbors of each site is infinite. Indeed, one can show that in the diagrammatic expansion of the lattice self-energy, only local diagrams survive when one goes into the infinite coordination limit.

Thus, as in classical mean-field theories, DMFT is supposed to get more accurate as the dimensionality (and thus the number of neighbors) increases. Put differently, for low dimensions, spatial fluctuations will render the DMFT approximation less reliable. 

Spatial fluctuations also become relevant in the vicinity of phase transitions. Here, DMFT and classical mean-field theories result in mean-field critical exponents, the pronounced changes before the phase transition are not reflected in the DMFT self-energy.

The DMFT loop
In order to find the local lattice Green's function, one has to determine the hybridization function such that the corresponding impurity Green's function will coincide with the sought-after local lattice Green's function.
The most widespread way of solving this problem is by using a forward recursion method, namely, for a given ,  and temperature :
 Make the DMFT approximation:  
 Compute the local Green's function 
 Compute the dynamical mean field 
 Solve the AIM for a new impurity Green's function , extract its self-energy: 
 Go back to step 2 until convergence, namely when .

Applications
The local lattice Green's function and other impurity observables can be used to calculate a number of physical quantities as a function of correlations , bandwidth, filling (chemical potential ), and temperature :
 the spectral function (which gives the band structure)
 the kinetic energy
 the double occupancy of a site
 response functions (compressibility, optical conductivity, specific heat)

In particular, the drop of the double-occupancy as  increases is a signature of the Mott transition.

Extensions of DMFT
DMFT has several extensions, extending the above formalism to multi-orbital, multi-site problems, long-range correlations and non-equilibrium.

Multi-orbital extension
DMFT can be extended to Hubbard models with multiple orbitals, namely with electron-electron interactions of the form  where  and  denote different orbitals. The combination with density functional theory (DFT+DMFT)     then allows for a realistic calculation of correlated materials.

Extended DMFT 
Extended DMFT yields a local impurity self energy for non-local interactions and hence allows us to apply DMFT for more  general models such as the t-J model.

Cluster DMFT 
In order to improve on the DMFT approximation, the Hubbard model can be mapped on a multi-site impurity (cluster) problem, which allows one to add some spatial dependence to the impurity  self-energy. Clusters contain 4 to 8 sites at low temperature and up to 100 sites at high temperature.

Diagrammatic extensions 
Spatial dependencies of the self energy beyond DMFT, including long-range correlations in the vicinity of a phase transition, can be obtained also through diagrammatic extensions of DMFT  using a combination of analytical and numerical techniques. The starting point of the dynamical vertex approximation  and of the dual fermion approach is the local two-particle vertex.

Non-equilibrium 
DMFT has been employed to study non-equilibrium transport and optical excitations. Here, the reliable calculation of the AIM's Green function out of equilibrium remains a big challenge.

References and notes

See also
Strongly correlated material

External links
 Strongly Correlated Materials: Insights From Dynamical Mean-Field Theory G. Kotliar and D. Vollhardt
 Lecture notes on the LDA+DMFT approach to strongly correlated materials Eva Pavarini, Erik Koch, Dieter Vollhardt, and Alexander Lichtenstein (eds.)
 Lecture notes DMFT at 25: Infinite Dimensions Eva Pavarini, Erik Koch, Dieter Vollhardt, and Alexander Lichtenstein (eds.)
 Lecture notes DMFT – From Infinite Dimensions to Real Materials Eva Pavarini, Erik Koch, Dieter Vollhardt, and Alexander Lichtenstein (eds.)

Correlated electrons
Materials science
Quantum mechanics
Electronic structure methods